Hochhaus Uptown München is a  skyscraper in the Moosach district of Munich, Germany. The 38-storey tower is the tallest skyscraper in the city.

The building's glass facade wraps the structure of the building like a tensioned membrane. Circular ventilation elements in the form of individually opening windows enable natural ventilation and provide a reference to the outside world by making the background noise noticeable even on the upper floors. A fifth building houses 139 apartments.

With its simple rectangular shape, the tower was perceived by some as anti-aesthetic. In particular, it provoked criticism that it interfered with the historic vista from Nymphenburg Palace. Uptown Munich was probably one of the main triggers for the efforts of the initiative "Our Munich" initiated by ex-mayor Georg Kronawitter, which culminated in a citizens' vote on November 21, 2004 preventing the construction of other buildings of this height in Munich.

It was planned by the architects Ingenhoven, Overdiek (Düsseldorf) and built from 2001 to 2004.  The cuboid structure has been much disputed. In November 2004, a referendum in Munich was held to decide whether the construction of high-rise buildings in the inner city should be prohibited; as a result, several building projects had to be changed substantially or given up completely. However, due to the very close result of the referendum and because the referendum's result was binding only for one year, there is an ongoing discussion in the city council on how to proceed with future building plans.

In August 2006, the skyscraper and one of the campus buildings was bought by the Government of Singapore for more than €300 million.

In 2017 the building was sold to Europa Capital and Bayern Projekt.

Tenants
Telefónica Europe (O2) is the building's anchor tenant.

Gallery

References

External links 

 Uptown München official website 

Uptown
Skyscraper office buildings in Germany
Office buildings completed in 2004